"December" is a song from Scottish-Irish folk rock band The Waterboys, which was released in 1983 as the second and final single from their debut studio album The Waterboys. The song was written and produced by Mike Scott, with additional production by Rupert Hine. A music video was filmed to promote the single.

Background
"December" was written in Ayr, Scotland, and recorded at Redshop in December 1981 and Farmyard in June 1982. It was one of the first songs recorded by Scott for what went on to become the Waterboys. At the time, Scott was a member of the band Funhouse and wished to leave and pursue a new musical path. He recorded three of his own tracks at Redshop in December 1981, including "December", with the engineer Jim Preen. Using pre-recorded drum loops available at the studio, Scott performed all instrumentation himself. Scott revealed to Sounds in 1983, "'December' was done in an eight track studio. It was just a Linn drum track and I played guitar and piano over the top and sang. There's no bass guitar on it, just the bottom end of the piano. That's all there is, yet it sounds massive because we mixed it using a 24 track studio."

Scott recorded the song's rhythm and two lead parts using his Danelectro "Bellzouki" 12-string guitar. In his autobiography, he said of the song's recording process with the guitar, "I laid it down in about thirty minutes - seven minutes for each overdub, and just about time to breathe in between. As the multiple-Bellzouki sound took shape, I was astonished at its breadth, and also at my own playing: the Bellzouki had inspired me beyond my limits, and the sound of my inner imagination was coming out of a pair of speaks in front of me." Additional recording on the track was carried out at Farmyard Studios in June 1982, with Rupert Hine providing additional production.

Critical reception
On its release as a single, Betty Page of Record Mirror commented, "Whimper, whimper. This week's 90th moody, tremulous ballad with lashings of tearful vibrato and acoustic twelve-strings. A record to sit down and listen to as the leaves fall, it informs us that 'December is the cool month'. Oh really?" Barney Hoskyns of New Musical Express gave the single a rating of six out of ten. He described it as a "big acoustic anatomy of melancholy" and added that it was "too long and involved for a single, but nice all the same". Jim Whiteford of the Kilmarnock Standard described the song as a "mid-tempo number" which is "heavily but effectively produced to give a rich sound around the slightly muffled vocal lead" and added that "the Bible story is there if you listen". He concluded that the song was "very hummable" and could have top 40 potential.

Allan Jones of Melody Maker wrote, "The Waterboys continue to wallow in a senseless melodrama. They expect the world to be too traumatic, are disappointed when their daily dramas don't match the sketches in their imagination: they exaggerate, and so they're unbelievable." Sunie of Number One considered "December" to be "a dispiriting little thing" and added, "The Waterboys have a singer who can't sing but clearly thinks he can. Their music is drippy modern rock, like U2 with the fire put out, and the song is an early bid for the religious Christmas hit." In 1984, U2 singer Bono included "December" in a list of his top ten records of 1983 for Rolling Stone.

In a review of the mini-album edition of The Waterboys, Diana Valois of The Morning Call considered the song to be "about coming of age" and noted the "fat and flavorful guitar work". Parke Puterbaugh of Rolling Stone described "December" as a "longish song, more meditative though no less inquisitive, as Scott, like Van Morrison, goes looking for the proverbial lion in the soul".

Formats

Personnel
December
 Mike Scott – vocals, rhythm guitar, lead guitar
 Rupert Hine, Steven Tayler – bass drum and cymbal programming

The Three Day Man
 Mike Scott – vocals, guitar, piano, harmonica
 Anthony Thistlethwaite – saxophone
 Matthew Seligman – bass
 Preston Heyman – drums

Red Army Blues
 Mike Scott – vocals, piano, guitar, bass
 Anthony Thistlethwaite – saxophone, mandolin
 Kevin Wilkinson – drums
 Ingrid Schroeder – vocals

Production
 Mike Scott – producer of "December" and "Red Army Blues"
 Rupert Hine – additional production on "December"
 Jim Preen – engineer on "December" and "Red Army Blue"
 Steven Tayler – engineer on "December"
 Harry Parker – producer of "The Three Day Man"
 Richard Digby Smith – engineer on "Red Army Blue"

Charts

References

The Waterboys songs
1983 songs
1983 singles
Songs written by Mike Scott (musician)
Song recordings produced by Rupert Hine
Ensign Records singles